A bazooka is an anti-tank rocket-launcher weapon.

Bazooka may also refer to:

People
 Cristiana Cucchi, Eurobeat singer  Bazooka Girl
 Mohamed Abdel Razek, Egyptian footballer nicknamed "Bazoka" or "Bazooka"
 Wilfredo Gómez, Puerto Rican boxer nicknamed "Bazooka"
 Rafael Limón, Mexican boxer nicknamed "Bazooka"
 Ike Quartey, Ghanaian boxer nicknamed "Bazooka"

Arts, entertainment, and media

Fictional characters
 Bazooka (G.I. Joe), a fictional character in the G.I. Joe universe
 Bazooka (Transformers), a character from the anime Beast Wars Neo
 Bazooka Joe, the comic character advertising the chewing gum brand

Music

Groups and labels
 Bazooka (band), a jazz music group
 Bazooka Joe (band), a British pub rock band, with its name derived from the comics character

Albums
 Bazooka, an album by Pat Travers & Carmine Appice
 Bazooka Tooth, the fourth studio album by American hip hop artist Aesop Rock, released on Definitive Jux in 2003

Other uses in music
 Bazooka (instrument), the musical instrument after which the weapon was named

Brands and enterprises
 Bazooka (chewing gum), a brand of chewing gum
 Bazooka Mobile Audio, the trade name and product line of mobile audio manufacturer Southern Audio Services

See also 
 Bazuka, a United States R&B music group